Jerome Carter (born October 25, 1982) is a former American football safety. He was drafted by the St. Louis Rams in the fourth round of the 2005 NFL Draft. He played college football at Florida State.

Carter has also been a member of the Dallas Cowboys and Florida Tuskers.

Early years
Carter attended Columbia High School in Lake City, Florida, where he first-team All-State selection, and as a senior, was named the top player in the state by The Gainesville Sun, and the Class 5A Player of the Year by the Florida Association of Coaches.

College career
Carter played college football at Florida State University where he finished his career with 257 tackles, 2.5 sacks and three interceptions. Carter was elected defensive team captain as a senior and was voted honorable mention All-Atlantic Coast Conference  as a junior. He majored in social science.

Professional career

St. Louis Rams
Carter was selected by the St. Louis Rams in the fourth round (117th overall) in the 2005 NFL Draft. In his rookie season he played in 14 games and finished the campaign with 38 tackles including a career-high 12 tackles at the Houston Texans on November 27.

In 2006, Carter made 18 tackles and recorded two interceptions. The first of his career came against the Detroit Lions on October 1.

Carter's 2007 season was cut short and only played in five games due to a foot injury. He finished the season with two tackles.

On March 11, 2008, Carter re-signed for the Rams as an unrestricted free agent. However, he was released by the Rams during final cuts on August 29, 2008 and spent the season out of football.

Dallas Cowboys
On January 12, 2009, Carter was signed to a future contract by the Dallas Cowboys. He was waived on August 5, 2009.

References

External links
Just Sports Stats
Florida State Seminoles bio

1982 births
Living people
People from Lake City, Florida
Players of American football from Florida
American football safeties
Florida State Seminoles football players
St. Louis Rams players
Dallas Cowboys players
Florida Tuskers players
Virginia Destroyers players